Hervé Pierre Braillard, known as Hervé Pierre, (born 1965), is a French-American fashion and costume designer.  In 1987, he received the first Christian Dior award from the Comité Colbert. Pierre has designed fashions for four United States first ladies including Laura Bush, Hillary Clinton, Michelle Obama, and Melania Trump since the 1990s.

Biography
After graduating from the École de la Chambre Syndicale de la Couture Parisienne he studied at the art history department of the Sorbonne. In 1987, he received the first Christian Dior award from the Comité Colbert. The next year he became assistant to Erik Mortensen at the Balmain fashion house. After the departure of Mortensen, Pierre created three of his own fashion collections in 1991 and 1992.

In addition to fashion, Pierre has also designed costumes for several opera houses. In 1992 he designed the costumes for Angelin Preljocaj’s version of the ballet Parade for Paris Opera Ballet  and the Sydney Opera House, followed by costumes for Preljocaj's ballet Le Parc for Paris Opera Ballet in 1994. He has also designed costumes for New York City Ballet (1998) and Berliner Staatsoper (1999).

In the beginning of the 1990s, he moved to the United States where he worked for Oscar De la Renta . He served as creative director for Vera Wang from 1998 to 2000 and then moved to Bill Blass to work under then Creative director Lars Nilsson.  After Bill Blass  he worked for Carolina Herrera for 14 years, where he left a position as creative director in February 2016. His clients have included US first ladies Hillary Clinton, Laura Bush and Michelle Obama.  Pierre has for several years been styling Melania Trump. In 2017, Pierre collaborated with her to design her gown for the Donald Trump inaugural balls. The dress was vanilla-colored and off-shoulder. It had a high slit, an arch across the torso and a red silk belt around the waistline. Pierre described Trump's contributions as both technical and aesthetic. The dress is exhibited at the National Museum of American History.

References 

1965 births
Living people
University of Paris alumni
French designers
French emigrants to the United States
French fashion designers